Meiogyne virgata is an Asian tree species in the family Annonaceae and tribe Miliuseae.  Originally described in 1825 as Unona virgata, it was later placed as the type species of the genus Meiogyne by Friedrich Anton Wilhelm Miquel.
This species has been recorded from: Borneo, Java, Malaya, Philippines, Thailand and Vietnam<ref name=powo>[http://powo.science.kew.org/taxon/urn:lsid:ipni.org:names:73818-1 Plants of the World Online: Meiogyne virgata (Blume) Miq. (retrieved 22 September 2020)]</ref> (where it is called thiều nhụy nhẵn'').

References

External links 
 
 

Flora of Indo-China
Flora of Malesia
Annonaceae